Broussard v. School Board of Norfolk, 801 F. Supp. 1526 (E.D. Va. 1992) was a court case that took place in Norfolk, Virginia, United States in 1992.  Kimberly Broussard, a middle school student was disciplined by the Norfolk Public Schools for wearing a t-shirt that read "Drugs Suck". When her parents sued on her behalf, her lawyer claimed that her shirt was a form of free speech protected by the First Amendment of the United States Constitution and the Tinker Standard. The United States District Court for the Eastern District of Virginia ruled in favor of the school board, saying that although the shirt displayed an anti-drug message, the word "suck" was a vulgar word with a sexual connotation and therefore not allowed in school.

See also
School speech
Guiles v. Marineau: a similar case with student T-shirts
Tinker v. Des Moines Independent Community School District, 393 U.S. 503 (1969)
Bethel School District v. Fraser, 478 U.S. 675 (1986)
Morse v. Frederick, 551 U.S. 393 (2007)
Obscenity
Cohen v. California, 403 U.S. 15 (1971)
Miller v. California, 413 U.S. 15 (1973)

External links
 
The case mentioned as precedent in another case

United States Free Speech Clause case law
United States District Court for the Eastern District of Virginia cases
Student rights case law in the United States
1992 in United States case law
1992 in education
Education in Norfolk, Virginia
History of Norfolk, Virginia
T-shirts